Pilostibes is a genus of moths of the family Xyloryctidae.

Species
 Pilostibes basivitta (Walker, 1864)
 Pilostibes embroneta Turner, 1902
 Pilostibes serpta Lucas, 1901
 Pilostibes stigmatias Meyrick, 1890

References

 
Xyloryctidae
Xyloryctidae genera